Passengers is a 2016 American science-fiction romance film directed by Morten Tyldum, written by Jon Spaihts and starring Jennifer Lawrence and Chris Pratt. The supporting cast features Michael Sheen, Laurence Fishburne and Andy García. The film follows two passengers on an immense interstellar spacecraft carrying thousands of people to a colony 60 light years from Earth, when the two are awakened 90 years early from their induced hibernation.

The script was written in 2007 by Spaihts, but languished in development hell with multiple actors attached and detached from it over the years until Sony Pictures Entertainment acquired its rights in late 2014. Lawrence, Pratt and Tyldum quickly joined the project, and filming took place from September 2015 to February 2016 in Atlanta. It was produced by Village Roadshow Pictures, Start Motion Pictures, Original Film, LStar Capital, Wanda Pictures and Company Films, and was the last film from Columbia Pictures with the involvement of Village Roadshow Pictures.

Passengers premiered at the Regency Village Theater in Los Angeles on December 14, 2016, and was released theatrically in the United States by Columbia Pictures on December 21, 2016, in standard format and RealD 3D. It received mixed reviews, with praise for Lawrence and Pratt's performances, Newman's musical score, and its visual style and production values, but was criticized for its plot and characters. It grossed $304 million worldwide and was nominated for Best Original Score and Best Production Design at the 89th Academy Awards.

Plot
The Avalon, a sleeper ship transporting 5,000 colonists and 258 crew members in hibernation pods, is traveling from Earth to the planet Homestead II, a 120-year journey. After only 30 years, an asteroid collision damages the ship despite its defense systems, causing a malfunction that awakens passenger James "Jim" Preston, a mechanical engineer, 90 years too early.

After a year of isolation, with only an android barman named Arthur for company, Jim grows despondent and contemplates suicide until he notices Aurora Lane, a beautiful young woman inside a pod. He views her video profile and is smitten. He considers reviving her for companionship, but struggles doing so, knowing it is morally wrong and will circumvent her intended life on their destination planet. He eventually awakens her, letting her believe it was also a malfunction. He tells Arthur to conceal what he has done. Aurora, devastated at having to live out her life on the ship, unsuccessfully tries to re-enter hibernation. Resigned to the situation, Aurora, a writer and journalist, begins writing about her experience.

Over the next year, the two fall in love. Just before Jim intends to propose to Aurora, Arthur inadvertently reveals the truth about her awakening. A distraught and enraged Aurora berates, shuns, and even physically attacks Jim. She furiously rejects his apologies and avoids contact with him.

Sometime later, another pod failure awakens Gus Mancuso, a deck chief officer. Using Gus' personnel code, the group accesses the ship's bridge (which Jim unsuccessfully tried to breach). They discover multiple cascading failures throughout the ship's systems, but the computer does not reveal the cause. If left unrepaired, the ship will inevitably fail, causing the passengers and crew to perish. Gus realizes that Jim awakened Aurora; Gus does not condone Jim's actions but understands, and tells Aurora that a "drowning man" (meaning the suicidal Jim) will grab onto any lifeline. When Gus falls critically ill, the ship's automated medical suite, the Autodoc, diagnoses pansystemic necrosis and gives him hours to live. Gus attributes it to his hibernation pod's multiple failures. Before dying, Gus gives Jim and Aurora his ID badge and employee code to access crew-only areas, so he and Aurora can try to repair the ship.

Jim and Aurora find hull breaches from the asteroid collision two years earlier. The computer module administering the ship's fusion reactor power plant has been critically damaged, causing the cascading malfunctions as the other systems' computing power was diverted in an attempt to maintain it. They replace the damaged module, but when the computer attempts to vent the reactor to extinguish a runaway plasma reaction, the exterior vent fails. Jim is forced to spacewalk and vent the plasma from outside, using the manual controls in the vent tube.

Jim discovers that he must remain in the tube to keep the vent open while Aurora initiates venting from inside the ship. Revealing her enduring feelings for him, she admits she is terrified of losing him and being left alone. Jim improvises a heat shield and survives the venting but is blasted out into space as his tether snaps, and his damaged spacesuit begins losing oxygen. Aurora retrieves a clinically dead Jim from space and resuscitates him in the Autodoc. The Avalon, its reactor repaired, returns to normal operations.

After burying Gus in space, Jim learns the Autodoc can function as a hibernation pod for one person; Aurora can go back into hibernation for the remainder of the voyage. Realizing she would never see Jim again, she chooses to remain awake with him. He presents her with the makeshift engagement ring he made earlier, which she accepts.

Eighty-eight years later, the ship's crew awakens on schedule, shortly before arrival at Homestead II. In the ship's grand concourse, they discover a huge tree with trailing vines, lush vegetation, flying birds, and a small cabin. A recording of Aurora's story describes the wonderful life she and Jim shared on the Avalon.

Cast
 Jennifer Lawrence as Aurora Lane, a journalist and writer
 Chris Pratt as Jim Preston, a mechanical engineer
 Michael Sheen as Arthur, an android bartender on the Avalon
 Laurence Fishburne as Gus Mancuso, the chief deck officer
 Andy García (in a non-speaking role) as Captain Norris, commanding officer of the Avalon
 Julee Cerda and Nazanin Boniadi as hologram instructors
 Aurora Perrineau as Celeste, Aurora's best friend seen in a video message

Emma Clarke, Chris Edgerly, Matt Corboy, Fred Melamed, and screenwriter Jon Spaihts perform as the voices of the Avalon, InfoMat, video game, observatory, and Autodoc, respectively.

Production

Development
In Jon Spaihts's original 2007 script, Aurora's surname was Dunn. At one point in the film's development, it was set to star Keanu Reeves and Emily Blunt. Other actors temporarily attached to it included Reese Witherspoon and Rachel McAdams. Brian Kirk was originally set to make his feature directorial debut with Reeves in the lead. On December 5, 2014, it was announced that Sony Pictures Entertainment had won the rights to the film, and in early 2015, Morten Tyldum was chosen to direct. He had always wanted to do a big-scale sci-fi movie, but also stressed the importance of character development over effects.

The final cast was announced between February 2015 and January 2016. Lawrence was paid $20 million against 30% of the profit after the movie broke even. Pratt received $12 million.

Filming
Principal photography began on September 15, 2015 at Pinewood Atlanta Studios in Atlanta, with most of it involving the two leads only. Rodrigo Prieto was cinematographer, and Maryann Brandon was film editor. Filming wrapped on February 12, 2016.

Music
Thomas Newman composed the score for Passengers. Spaihts said that he wrote Passengers while listening to Newman's previous scores.  Imagine Dragons also recorded the song "Levitate" for the soundtrack, which was released on November 29, 2016. The Chinese theme song for the film is "Light Years Away", composed by G.E.M.; it became the first Chinese music video to surpass 200 million views in September 2019.

Marketing
At the 2016 CinemaCon, Passengers was featured by Sony Pictures chairman Thomas Rothman with Lawrence and Pratt in attendance. A teaser trailer of unfinished footage was shown afterwards. The first official images of the film were released on August 12, 2016.

Release

Theatrical
In August 2015, Sony Pictures Entertainment set the film's release date for December 21, 2016, in the United Kingdom, United States and Canada. It was concurrently released in 3D and RealD 3D formats, with the international rollout running from Christmas to January 12, 2017.

Home media
Passengers was released on DVD, Blu-ray, and 4K Ultra HD Blu-ray on March 14, 2017, and made available on digital HD from Amazon Video and iTunes on March 7, 2017.
On March 14, 2017, Passengers: Awakening, a virtual-reality experience based on the film launched for  Oculus Rift and HTC Vive.

Reception

Box office
Passengers grossed $100 million in the United States and Canada and $203.1 million in other territories for a worldwide total of $303.1 million, against a net production budget of $110 million. It was the second-highest grossing original live-action Hollywood release of 2016, after La La Land.

Passengers opened alongside Sing and Assassin's Creed, and was initially expected to gross around $50 million from 3,478 theaters over its first six days, although the studio anticipated a more conservative $35 million debut. After making $1.2 million from Tuesday night previews and $4.1 million on its first day, projections for the six-day opening were lowered to $27 million. It went on to gross $15.1 million in its opening weekend (a six-day total of $30 million), finishing third at the box office behind Rogue One and Sing. It became the third-biggest original live-action domestic release of 2016 behind La La Land ($149 million) and Central Intelligence ($126 million).

Critical response
On Rotten Tomatoes, the film has an approval rating of 30% based on reviews from 290 critics with an average rating of 5.00/10. The website's critical consensus reads: "Passengers proves Chris Pratt and Jennifer Lawrence work well together – and that even their chemistry isn't enough to overcome a fatally flawed story." On Metacritic, the film has a weighted average score of 41 out of 100, based on 48 reviews, indicating "mixed or average reviews". Audiences polled by CinemaScore gave the film an average grade of "B" on an A+ to F scale, while PostTrak reported filmgoers gave it a 77% overall positive score.

Mick LaSalle of The San Francisco Chronicle gave the film 3 out of 4 stars, writing: "Despite the confinement and the limited cast, Passengers has moments of intense drama that take the actors to places of extreme feeling." James Dyer of Empire gave the film 4 out of 5 stars, saying it was "as surprisingly traditional as it is undeniably effective", and describing it as "Titanic amongst the stars" and "a touching, heartfelt tale of loss and love for the Gravity generation". Peter Keough of The Boston Globe gave it 2.5 out of 4 stars, stating: "Perhaps as a well-written play for a cast of three, Passengers might have been first class. Instead, it's just another mediocre thrill ride." Peter Bradshaw of The Guardian called the film an "appealing sci-fi romance", but criticized its final act as an "anticlimax", giving it 3 out of 5 stars. Sheri Linden of The Hollywood Reporter said it "concocts a sort of Titanic in outer space, with dollops of ‘Sleeping Beauty’ and Gravity thrown into the high-concept mix." She praised the striking visual design and elegant costumes, but said that the "heavy-handed mix of life-or-death exigencies and feel-good bromides finally feels like a case of more being less."

Rebecca Hawkes of The Telegraph described the film as not a romance, but "a creepy ode to manipulation", describing the action as a "central act of violence" that is softened and justified.  Andrew Pulver of The Guardian called it an "interstellar version of social-media stalking" with "a fantastically creepy start" that, contrary to romantic comedies that managed to "plane down" the nastiness of stalking tactics, presented them in a way where they were "gruesomely inescapable". Alissa Wilkinson of Vox called it "a fantasy of Stockholm syndrome, in which the captured eventually identifies with and even loves the captor" and "a really disturbing wish fulfillment fantasy".

Lawrence was initially proud of the film, but agreed with suggestions that it might have benefited from a different edit, starting with her character waking up. Later Lawrence said that Adele had advised her against doing the film and she should have listened. Producer Neal Moritz said he loved the film and thought the script was one of the best he had ever read. He pointed out that it was well received at test screenings, but that shortly before its release the media picked up on one review and "it became a mantra". He "thought it was a really unfair thing because I think it's a beautiful film I couldn't be more proud of."

Accolades

References

External links
 
 
 
 
 
 
 

2016 films
2016 3D films
2010s adventure films
2010s romance films
2016 science fiction films
American 3D films
American adventure drama films
American robot films
American science fiction adventure films
American science fiction romance films
American space adventure films
Columbia Pictures films
Films about writers
Films directed by Morten Tyldum
Films produced by Neal H. Moritz
Films scored by Thomas Newman
Films set in the future
Films set on spacecraft
Films shot at Pinewood Atlanta Studios
Films shot in Atlanta
Original Film films
Village Roadshow Pictures films
Wanda Pictures films
Generation ships in fiction
Cryonics in fiction
2010s English-language films
2010s American films